Mimeresia cellularis, the cellular harlequin, is a butterfly in the family Lycaenidae. It is found in Ivory Coast, Ghana, southern Nigeria, Cameroon, Gabon and the Republic of the Congo. The habitat consists of forests.

References

Butterflies described in 1890
Poritiinae
Taxa named by William Forsell Kirby
Butterflies of Africa